The  is a unit of the Japan Air Self-Defense Force based at Naha Air Base in Okinawa Prefecture. Under the authority of the Southwestern Air Defense Force, the flight operates Kawasaki T-4 aircraft.

References

Units of the Japan Air Self-Defense Force